Mandi Bahauddin, also spelled Mandi Baha ud Din, (Punjabi and ) is a district in the Punjab province of Pakistan. 

Mandi Bahauddin District is in the north-central area of the province of Punjab, Pakistan. It is bordered on the northwest by the Jhelum River, on the southeast by the Chenab River (which separates it from Gujranwala District and Gujrat District), and on the southwest by the Sargodha District. Mandi district currently has 1.5 million population. In 1998, it had a population of 1.16 million people.

Administration
Mandi Bahauddin is subdivided into Three tehsils and 80 Union Councils:

Geography
The district forms a central portion of the Chaj Doab lying between the Jhelum and Chenab rivers. It is bounded on the north by the Jhelum river, which separates it from Jhelum district; on the west by Sargodha district, on the south by the river Chenab (which separates it from the Gujranwala and Hafizabad districts); and on the east by Gujrat district. The district comprises the Mandi Bahauddin, Phalia, and Malakwal tehsils.

Demographics
At the time of the 2017 census, the district had a population of 1,594,039, of which 775,788 were male and 818,056 female. 1,267,681 lived in rural areas while 326,358 lived in urban areas. Islam is the religion of nearly the entire population with 99.57% of the population, while a small minority of Christians lives mainly in the urban area.

At the time of the 2017 census 96.50% of the population spoke Punjabi, 1.74% Urdu and 1.48% Pashto as their first language. The dialect of Punjabi spoken here is close to the standard language.

According to the 1998 Pakistan census, the population of the district was 1,160,552, 14.93% of whom lived in urban environments.

Climate
This district has a moderate climate, hot in summer and cold in winter. During the peak of summer the temperature may rise to  during the day, but in the winter months the minimum temperature may fall below .

Notable people
Hasan Askari Rizvi, Chief Minister Punjab (Caretaker)
Mustansar Hussain Tarar, Pakistani novelist, columnist, travel writer and TV host
Naved Arif Gondal, Pakistani cricketer
Pervaiz Mehdi Qureshi Ex Chief Of Pakistan Air Force
Shaukat Ali folk singer
Hasan Ali cricketer
Mumtaz Ahmed Tarar, M.N.A Federal Minister of Human Rights (PML-N, Ex PPP)
Hameeda Waheeduddin M.P.A Minister of Women Development Punjab (PML-N, Ex PLM-Q)
Nasir Iqbal Bosal, M.N.A. Cousin of District Chairman Mandi Bahauddin (PML-N, Ex PLM-Q)
Muhammad Tariq Tarar Ex M.N.A (PTI, Ex PPP)
Pir Syed Muhammad Binyamin Rizvi Ex Minister of Punjab (PML-N)
Basma Riaz Choudhry Ex M.P.A (PML-Q)
Asif Bashir Bhagat Ex M.P.A (PPP).
Haji imtaz Ahmad Chaudhry MNA PTI

References

 
Districts of Punjab, Pakistan